Alexander Jones may refer to:

Politicians
Alexander H. Jones (1822–1901), U.S. representative
Alexander Jones (MP), 16th century British Member of Parliament for Bridgewater (1597–1598)

Others
Alexander Jones (footballer) (1854–1878), Welsh international footballer
Alexander Delos "Boss" Jones (1818–1897), American master carpenter and architect
Alexander C. Jones (1830–1898), American businessman and Confederate soldier 
Alexander Jones (classicist), on List of Guggenheim Fellowships awarded in 2005
Alexander Jones (officer), on HMS Naiad

See also
Alex Jones (disambiguation)
Alec Jones (1924–1983), British Labour Party politician